Calacoto or Qala Qutu (Aymara qala stone, qutu heap, pile, "stone pile") is the third municipal section of the Pacajes Province in the  La Paz Department, Bolivia. Its seat is Calacoto (Qala Qutu).

Geography 
Some of the highest mountains of the municipality are listed below:

See also 
 Jach'a Jawira
 Jach'a Phasa
 Llallawa Jawira

References 

 www.ine.gov.bo / census 2001: Calacoto Municipality

Municipalities of La Paz Department (Bolivia)